Thomas 'Tom' F. Trail (born July 29, 1935, in Moscow, Idaho) is a former Republican Idaho State Representative from 1996 to 2012.

Education
Trail graduated from Moscow High School and earned his bachelor's degree in animal science from the University of Idaho. He earned his master's degree from the University of Maryland and earned his doctorate in experimental psychology from Montana State University.

Elections

Idaho House of Representative District 6 Seat A

2010 
Trail was unopposed in the Republican primary. Trail defeated Democratic nominee Judith Brown again this time with 57.4% of the vote in the general election.

2008 
Trail was unopposed in the Republican primary. Trail defeated Democratic nominee Judith Brown with 53.4% of the vote in the general election.

2006 
Trail was unopposed for the Republican primary and the general election.

2004 
Trail was unopposed for the Republican primary. Trail defeated Democratic nominee Mark Solomon with 60.8% of the vote in the general election.

2002 
Redistricted to District 6, and with Representative Frank Bruneel re-districted to District 7, Trail was unopposed for the Republican primary and the general election.

Idaho House of Representative District 5 Seat A

2000 
Trail was unopposed for the Republican primary. Trail defeated Democratic nominee Don Combs with 60% of the vote in the general election.

1998 
Trail was unopposed for the Republican primary and the general election.

1996 
When Republican Representative Doc Lucas left the District 5 A seat open, Trail won the Republican primary with 75% of the vote against Buck Kimsey. Trail defeated Democratic nominee Vera White with 52.8% of the vote in the general election.

References

External links
Tom Trail at the Idaho Legislature (bad link)
 

1935 births
Living people
Republican Party members of the Idaho House of Representatives
Montana State University alumni
People from Moscow, Idaho
United States Army soldiers
University of Idaho alumni
University of Maryland, College Park alumni
University of Nebraska faculty
University of Washington faculty